The Google Story is a book by David Vise and Mark Malseed that takes an in-depth look at the founding of Google and why it is unique among information technology companies. The book discusses the founders, the company, and the culture that Google is known for. It was published on November 15, 2005.

External links
 
After Words interview with Vise on The Google Story, March 4, 2006

2005 non-fiction books
American history books
Books about multinational companies
Books about the San Francisco Bay Area
Books about computer and internet entrepreneurs
Books about Google